is a railway station in Mooka, Tochigi Prefecture, Japan, operated by the Mooka Railway.

Lines
Kitayama Station is a station on the Mooka Line, and is located 22.9 rail kilometers from the terminus of the line at Shimodate Station.

Station layout
Kitayama Station has a single side platform serving traffic in both directions. The station building is located on a slight embankment. The station is unattended.

History
Kitayama Station opened on 11 March 1989.

Surrounding area
Japan National Route 294

External links

 Mooka Railway Station information 

Railway stations in Tochigi Prefecture
Railway stations in Japan opened in 1989
Mooka, Tochigi